Harper Valley PTA is a 1978 American comedy film inspired by the popular 1968 country song "Harper Valley PTA" written by Tom T. Hall and performed by country singer Jeannie C. Riley. The film starred Barbara Eden, Nanette Fabray, Ronny Cox, Louis Nye and Susan Swift, directed by Richard Bennett and Ralph Senensky (who left the production during filming, and was replaced by Bennett), and primarily released to drive-in theaters throughout the summer of 1978. The film has a cult following in fans of the original song. The film's promotional tagline is: "The song was scandalous. The movie is hilarious!"

Plot
Stella Johnson is a beautiful widowed single mother who lives in the town of Harper Valley, Ohio. She sells cosmetics door-to-door for the fictitious AngelGlo Cosmetics and is not afraid to enjoy life. Her fourteen-year-old daughter, Dee, is a student at Harper Valley Junior High School.

After leaving school, Dee brings her mother a letter from the school's Parent Teacher Association board, which is led by the pompous and snobbish Flora Simpson-Reilly. The letter denounces her for her not following the societal mores of the day and the community, and threatens to expel Dee from school if Stella does not change her ways more to the board's liking.

Infuriated by the board's supposed superiority and their glaring hypocrisy, Stella storms to the PTA meeting being held that day, and proceeds to tell most of the PTA members off by exposing their hidden skeletons for the town to see.

After her house is toilet papered and a rock with a vile note attached is thrown through her window in retaliation, Stella prepares to get even with those who would want her driven out of town. She teams up with her friends, beautician Alice Finley and bartender Herbie Maddox, and (along with Dee's help) exacts revenge on six of the hypocritical PTA members, with methods that include: tricking a married male board member who has repeatedly tried to date Stella into a disastrous rendezvous; embarrassing Mrs. Simpson-Reilly at one of her grand social gatherings; exposing the secret antics of a supposedly prim-and-proper female board member/teacher; and sending a herd of pink-painted elephants into the bedroom of an alcoholic board member.

Stella finds out that one of the male PTA members, wealthy Willis Newton (who was not a party to the PTA letter), has fallen in love with her. Will and another male on the PTA board, Skeeter Duggan, the town's notary public, are sympathetic to Stella and do not agree with Flora and her cronies. After being informed by Will of the current PTA board's incompetence and mismanagement and with his help, Stella is convinced to make a run for President of the PTA, a move which infuriates Flora and her allies.

After a makeover, which sees her braces removed and her hair styled, Dee also finds a boyfriend in handsome Carlyle, a popular school track star, which incurs the jealousy of Bettina Reilly, the equally snobbish granddaughter of Flora. Also shown are Edwina, Bettina's identical twin sister who is just as snobbish as Bettina, and Dee's best friend Mavis.

Real estate agent Kirby Baker, a member of the PTA Board, plans to ruin Stella by foreclosing on her house (which his company owns), but is arrested for assaulting Myrna Wong, an Asian-American martial arts expert helping Stella to set up the lecherous Baker. Now things become more and more desperate.

The board finally decide to resort to criminal means to maintain the power they hold, which is fast slipping away thanks to Stella's growing popularity. The board members then decide to hire a couple of thugs named Dutch and Tex to have Skeeter abducted so they can commit election fraud. The two assailants assault Skeeter and take him to a nearby abbey, where he is plied with wine to make him drunk.

Olive Glover, the PTA's Recording Secretary who has a hardcore gambling addiction, has stolen money from the Milk Fund Rally, one of the PTA's numerous fund raisers, and intends to having Mavis framed for the crime and arrested. Leaving Dee to stall the PTA Board meeting, Stella and Alice follow Olive to a racing stable and recover the stolen money, some of which had been marked by Will.

As Stella and Alice race back to town, Will and Herbie spot the kidnappers and Skeeter outside the abbey from a helicopter and notify the girls. Disguised as nuns, Stella and Alice find Skeeter, free him and manage to escape with him after a wild car chase ending with the kidnappers crashing into a stream.

Ultimately, Flora's scheme to prevent Stella's nomination fails miserably: Olive, who would have been the swing vote against Stella, is arrested for embezzlement just as the PTA Board is about to vote against Stella's candidacy. Dutch and Tex, already in custody for the Skeeter Duggan kidnapping, tell the police that Flora was behind it all to keep Stella off the PTA Board.

Stella decisively wins the election and becomes the new PTA president, with the whole town voting to get rid of Flora and her snobbish friends. Will and Stella then fly off in his helicopter to get married.

Cast and characters
 Barbara Eden as Stella Johnson, a widowed cosmetics salesperson with a young daughter, whose joie de vivre, her principles, and her individuality anger most of the powerful people in town and on the Parent Teachers Association board.  She inevitably becomes PTA president after embarrassing Flora, the snobby former President and her equally snobby friends.
 Ronny Cox as Willis "Will" Newton, a wealthy member of the PTA who doesn't agree with Flora and her snobby allies and is in love with Stella. He and Stella get married at the end of the movie.
 Nanette Fabray as Alice Finley, Stella's best friend and co-conspirator against the snobs of Harper Valley. She owns and operates the La Moderne Beauty Shop.
 Louis Nye as Kirby Baker, a local real estate agent who is allied with Flora and her friends. Notorious for being a lecherous playboy and infamous for impregnating his secretaries, one of whom, Gladys Wilmot, left town to see an abortion care provider in Cincinnati. As part of a plan to discredit Stella, he tries to foreclose on Stella's house, which infuriates her. He then gets arrested and jailed for attacking Myrna Wong, a friend of Stella's, who rebuffs his advances, throwing him by use of martial arts and destroying the office.
 John Fiedler as Bobby Taylor, a man on the PTA who lusts after Stella. Overly dominated by his wife, Holly. Although open to allow Stella to speak, he is not above having a fellow PTA board member kidnapped to commit election fraud. He was arrested for indecent exposure after being set up by Stella.
 Ron Masak as Herbie Maddox, the head bartender at Kelly's bar, and Stella's ally against Flora and her friends. He has a crush on Stella, and is one of her friends.
 Clint Howard as Corley, a young delivery person, who works for the local florist shop, who brings Stella flowers from Will.
 Susan Swift as Dee Johnson, Stella's 14-year-old daughter, who is threatened with expulsion from school if her mother doesn't conform to the way the PTA wants her to behave. She has a hand in assisting her mother and Alice with one of their revenge schemes. She loses her braces, gets a makeover, and ends up with a boyfriend, Carlyle.
 Pat Paulsen as Otis Harper, the descendant of the founding family of Harper Valley. A PTA member who is allied with Flora and her friends. Has a tendency to drink all the time, which annoys his wife, Bertha. He had a stampede of elephants, painted pink, stormed through his house, destroying it.
 Amzie Strickland as Shirley Thompson, a member of the PTA board who tends to drink a lot of gin. Though she is allied with Flora and her friends, she is one of four PTA members (Will, Skeeter and Holly Taylor are the others) who are spared any retribution from Stella. She was seen as the most sympathetic of the board, as she tended to be more manipulated as opposed to being manipulative. It was never revealed whether or not she retained her seat on the PTA, but it is presumed that she became more sympathetic towards Stella as she was seen waving goodbye at Olive as she was being arrested.
 Bob Hastings as Skeeter Duggan, a member of the PTA board, and the town's Notary public who is sympathetic to Stella. He is kidnapped by Dutch and Tex at Flora Simpson Reilly's orders.
 Audrey Christie as Flora Simpson-Reilly, The movie's main antagonist. She is the pompous and extremely snobbish president of the PTA board who thoroughly despises Stella (who defeats her for president at the end of the movie) and all she stands for. So desperate is she to retain her power and prestige in the community that she has a fellow member of the PTA (Skeeter Duggan) kidnapped so she and her allies can commit election fraud. She is embarrassed when her permanent set is destroyed by a hair depilatory at the beauty salon.
 Molly Dodd as Olive Glover, the recording secretary of the PTA who is a gambling addict. Clearly the most corrupt and most vindictive member of the PTA board, she is eventually arrested for embezzlement after having a load of hay and horse manure dumped on top of her. She is the one who initially angers Stella by sending her the letter denouncing her, and tries to get Dee's friend, Mavis, arrested for embezzlement.
 Fay DeWitt as Willamae Jones, a snide biology teacher at the junior high school who is also a member of the PTA. She makes no secret of the fact that she favors the Reilly twins, due to the connections between her and Flora. Notorious for being a nymphomaniac (though she hides it under a prim-and-proper façade), she is caught in flagrante delicto with Barney Crunk, the town's mailman, on film.
 DeVera Marcus as Holly Taylor, Bobby's obviously overbearing wife, who tends to drink a lot when Bobby is out of town, and doesn't approve of Bobby's lusting, or of anything else he does (this is different from the character in the song, who "seems to use a lot of ice whenever [her husband]'s away", implying adultery with the iceman). However, despite her ties to Flora and her scheming friends, she, like Shirley Thompson, is spared any retribution from Stella, due to Stella refusing to date Bobby.
 Louise Foley as Mavis, Dee Johnson's best friend, who is nearly framed for a crime she did not commit by the vindictive Olive Glover.
 Brian Cook as Carlyle, a popular track star who chooses Dee, after she gets a makeover, and angers Bettina Reilly in the process.
 Laura Teige as Bettina Reilly, One of Flora's twin granddaughters, who wants to be with Carlyle, and is jealous when he chooses Dee over her. She tends to be as snotty as her grandmother.
 Jan Teige as Edwina Reilly, Bettina's twin sister, who is just as snotty.
 Irene Yah-Ling Sun as Myrna Wong, a friend of Stella's who is a judo expert; she is assaulted by Kirby Baker, destroys him and his office in retaliation, and has him sent to jail for assault.
 Tobias Anderson as "Cranky" Barney Crunk, the town's nosy mailman who had the bad habit of peeking in everyone's mail. He is caught in flagrante delicto on film with Willamae Jones.
 Royce D. Applegate as Dutch, one of two kidnappers who abduct Skeeter Duggan at Flora Simpson-Reilly's orders.
 J. J. Barry as Tex, the mastermind of the kidnap plot to get Skeeter Duggan out of the way so Flora Simpson-Reilly and her friends could commit election fraud. He and his accomplice Dutch are arrested and the two of them rat out Flora and her friends on their scheme.
 Pitt Herbert as Henry Reilly, Flora's overly dominated husband and grandfather to Edwina and Bettina. Henry is wealthy, but is very weak-willed and is known for acquiescing to his wife's schemes.
 Arlen Stuart as Bertha Harper, wife of Otis Harper, who gets annoyed by her husband's continual drinking. She is terrified when her house is destroyed by pink-painted elephants.
 Woody Harrelson as an extra. Perhaps this launched his professional career.

Production and release

Filming
Harper Valley PTA was filmed over 27 days, from October 1, 1977 to December 8, 1977. It was filmed on location for one week in Lebanon, Ohio and continued in Los Angeles, California. Woody Harrelson was a junior in high school living in Lebanon when the production was filming there, and was an extra in the film. The track meet scene was filmed at Simi Valley High School.

Director Ralph Senensky left the production two weeks before the end of principal photography and was replaced by Richard Bennett. On October 31, 1977, Senensky argued with the producers about a scene featuring pink elephants in the Hancock Park neighborhood of Los Angeles, California, believing that the animals would be spooked by filming on Halloween night. Senensky turned out to be right.  Nanette Fabray was knocked to the ground by a spooked elephant and production ceased temporarily. She suffered a severe concussion, bruises and back sprains and was taken to Cedars-Sinai Medical Center where her condition was reported as serious but stable. Filming resumed on November 30, after Fabray recovered.

Release
Harper Valley PTA opened in six theaters in Lebanon, Cincinnati, and Dayton, Ohio, on May 23, 1978, in accordance with executive producer Phil Borack's plan to release the film first in smaller markets, where regional success could encourage bigger cities to book the film. The film grossed over $2 million its opening weekend, $5.8 million in its first three weeks and over $16 million after 12 weeks. The film opened in limited release on June 2, 1978; in Los Angeles on August 2, 1978; and in New York City on January 12, 1979.

Soundtrack

Harper Valley PTA: Original Soundtrack Recording was released in June 1978 on vinyl, cassette tape and 8-track tape by Plantation Records. To promote the film's release and its soundtrack, the title song by Jeannie C. Riley was re-issued as a single. The album made its CD premiere through Varèse Sarabande on October 27, 2017.

Side 1
"Harper Valley PTA" – Jeannie C. Riley (3:12)
"Dee's Visit" (instrumental) – Nelson Riddle (2:10)
"Mr. Harper" – Barbara Eden (2:22)
"Alice's Place" (instrumental) – Nelson Riddle (2:29)
"High School Confidential" – Jerry Lee Lewis (3:07)
"Willie May" (instrumental) – Nelson Riddle (2:01)

Side 2
"Harper Valley PTA" (instrumental) – Nelson Riddle (1:55)
"Widow Jones" – Barbara Eden (2:38)
"Twin Tune" (instrumental) – Nelson Riddle (1:30)
"Ballad of a Teenage Queen" – Johnny Cash (2:51)
"Ice Cream Disco" (instrumental) – Nelson Riddle (1:48)
"Whatever Happened to Charlie Brown" – Rita Remington & Carol Channing (2:40)
"Ending (Reprise: Harper Valley PTA)" (instrumental) – Nelson Riddle (1:06)

Television series

In 1981, Harper Valley PTA was made into a television sitcom (created by Sherwood Schwartz) which aired on NBC from January 1981 to May 1982. Barbara Eden reprised her role as Stella Johnson for the series which lasted two seasons and a total of 30 episodes were produced.

References

External links

 

1978 films
1978 comedy films
American comedy films
American independent films
1970s feminist films
American films about revenge
Films adapted into television shows
Films based on songs
Films scored by Nelson Riddle
Films set in Ohio
Films shot in Ohio
Films shot in Los Angeles
1978 soundtrack albums
Comedy film soundtracks
Films directed by Ralph Senensky
Films about parenting
1970s English-language films
1970s American films